Adele Dorothy Diamond  is a professor of neuroscience at the University of British Columbia, where she is currently a Tier 1 Canada Research Chair in Developmental Cognitive Neuroscience. One of the pioneers in the field of developmental cognitive neuroscience, Diamond researches how executive functions are affected by biological and environmental factors, especially in children. Her discoveries have improved treatment for disorders such as phenylketonuria and attention-deficit hyperactivity disorder, and they have impacted early education.

Early life and education 
Diamond's father, Jerome Diamond, was born in 1903 in the Catskills of New York. His was the first Jewish family in Monticello, NY. In the early years they were met with signs everywhere that said, "No Jews and dogs allowed." He attended a one-room schoolhouse and left school to help in the family grocery business. He died as she was entering her senior year in high school. Diamond's mother, Mildred Golden, weighed 2 pounds when she was born in 1916 in New York City. She was placed in a small egg box, put in the oven (to keep her warm), and fed with an eye dropper.  She attended Tilden High School in Brooklyn and would have attended college if not for the Great Depression, but instead became the bookkeeper for the family business, Golden Pickle Works. She died in 1997.

Diamond grew up in Brooklyn and Queens and attended public schools (PS 165, Parsons Junior High, and John Bowne High School). She graduated from John Bowne High School as Valedictorian.

She attended Swarthmore College on a four-year Swarthmore National Scholarship and graduated in 1975, majoring in Sociology-Anthropology and Psychology. She was a member of the Varsity Volleyball and Archery teams all four years.  She graduated Phi Beta Kappa with the highest honor in the course program of study. While still at Swarthmore, in 1972, she attended the London School of Economics, studying the philosophy of science with Imre Lakatos, an important Popperian philosopher.

Diamond did her PhD graduate work at Harvard University (graduating in 1983), with a four-year NSF Graduate Fellowship for those thought to have outstanding research promise and a three-year Danforth Graduate Fellowship for those committed to university teaching.
  
Although officially a PhD candidate in Psychology, she spent her first four years of graduate school working primarily in Anthropology (under John and Bea Whiting and Bob LeVine) and Sociology (under Christopher Jencks); this made sense because from 1972-1986, the department at Harvard was formally the Department of Psychology and Social Relations, which at least attempted to maintain interdisciplinary relationships between psychologists, sociologists, and anthropologists. At that time, Harvard had an NIMH-funded Pre-doctoral Training Program in Cross-Cultural Psychological Research and the program awarded Diamond three years of funding for her dissertation: one year to prepare to go into the field, one year to go anywhere in the world to do the research (she chose the South Pacific because it seemed the most idyllic), and one year to write up the results. People were very enthusiastic about her thesis topic: "Is the need to be master of your fate intrinsically human or a product of Western culture?" However, she didn't think she was coming up with a good way to study it and that the famous people advising her were not either. They seemed not to be concerned, saying, "Don't worry. You do great work." Not wanting to go and do poor science, Diamond returned the money for Years 2 and 3.

Having given up her initial thesis topic, she returned to a question that Jerome Kagan had posed very excitedly in Diamond's first year in graduate school: "If infants all over the world show the same cognitive changes at roughly the same time, those changes cannot be due entirely to learning or experience, because their experiences are too diverse; there must be a maturational component; what might that maturational component be?" To answer that question, Diamond had to turn to neuroscience. She turned to neuroscience not because of an intrinsic interest in it per se; rather her motivation was to answer a particular question that required a neuroscientific approach.

The maturational component would clearly be in the brain, and Diamond hypothesized that maturational changes in the brain's PFC made possible the impressive cognitive advances seen between 6–12 months of age.  At that time no one was studying the PFC or any topic in cognitive neuroscience in the Harvard Psychology Department; Steve Kosslyn did not arrive until 1977.  Diamond learned from books on her own and was granted permission to add Nelson Butters from the Boston VA (who had published widely on the anatomy and functions of prefrontal cortex) to her thesis committee.

To get hard evidence on the brain to support her hypothesis, Diamond went to Yale University School of Medicine to work with Patricia Goldman-Rakic. That work was supported by Sloan and NIMH Postdoctoral Fellowship Awards.

Research career

Research in the 1980s
Diamond organized a seminal conference, “The Development and Neural Basis of Higher Cognitive Functions,” that brought together developmental psychologists, neuroscientists, and cognitive scientists who were using the same behavioral paradigms but did not know it because people in different fields had not been talking to one another.  The conference and resulting book served to jumpstart many research collaborations and the nascent field of developmental cognitive neuroscience.

Research in the 1990s
Adele Diamond's team made two discoveries that led to worldwide improvements in the medical treatment for phenylketonuria (PKU), improving the lives of thousands of children. Prof. Diamond identified the biological mechanism causing EF deficits in children treated for PKU, and, demonstrated how to prevent those deficits.  She did that by combining neurochemical and behavioral work in animals — creating the first animal model of treated PKU along the way  — with longitudinal testing of an extensive battery of neurocognitive tasks in infants and children. She provided the first demonstration of a visual deficit in treated PKU children (which changed international guidelines for the age of treatment onset and that markedly improved children's lives.)

Diamond's team went on to discover a long-lasting visual deficit if children with PKU are not started on diet within days of birth (the norm had been to start them within 2 weeks of birth).

Research in the 2000s
Her 2005 paper on the fundamental neurobiological and clinical differences between the inattentive-type ADHD and those ADHD types in which hyperactivity is present was titled "BADD (ADHD without hyperactivity), a neurobiologically and behaviorally distinct disorder from ADHD (with hyperactivity)".

Her randomized controlled trial of Tools of the Mind was the first study to demonstrate that: 
 executive functions can be improved in regular classrooms by regular teachers without expensive high-tech equipment. 
 play is an important part of improving executive functions and school achievement, rather than play taking time away from the important task of improving academic achievement.  
 executive functions can be improved very early (in children only 4–5 years of age) - critical in heading off problems before they develop.

Recent research
Much of Diamond's work has started with a "YES, YOU CAN" premise: even though a child may appear incapable of doing or understanding something, if we pose the question differently or teach the concept in new ways, the child can succeed. Diamond illustrated this approach first with infants' understanding of the concept of contiguity, then with their ability to grasp abstract concepts, and next with children's ability to succeed on a Stroop-like task requiring memory and inhibition.

Her lab is now investigating:
 the power of the arts (music and the spoken word) to improve mood and slow or reverse cognitive decline with aging.
 whether children with ADHD are being over-medicated for optimal school performance.
 the effects of stress on EFs, and how that differs by gender and genotype.

Selected awards and honors
In 2009, Diamond was elected as a Fellow of the Royal Society of Canada.

In 2000, she received the 21st Century Award for Achievement, and was named one of the "2000 Outstanding Women of the 20th Century" by IBC, Cambridge, UK. In 2009, Diamond received the YWCA Woman of Distinction Award. In 2014, Diamond received the Urie Bronfenbrenner Award for Lifetime Contributions to Developmental Psychology in the Service of Science and Society from the American Psychological Association. In 2015, Ben-Gurion University of the Negev conferred an honorary doctorate (Doctor of Philosophy Honoris Causa) on Diamond. For more than a decade now, she has held a Tier 1 Canada Research Chair.

She is regularly invited as a keynote speaker to many conferences, workshops and technical meetings every year.

Teacher and speaker
Diamond's courses routinely get glowing reviews and are top rated.  This has been true since her early days as an assistant professor at the University of Pennsylvania
 through to the present day as a Canada Research Chair at the University of British Columbia.

She is also a much sought-after speaker. She has delivered over 500 invited talks including hundreds of keynote addresses and over 20 named lectures. She has given these in Canada, the US, Australia, Austria, Belgium, Brazil, Chile, Denmark, Ecuador, Germany, India, Indonesia, Israel, Italy, Lebanon, Mexico, the Netherlands, New Zealand, Portugal, South Africa, Spain, Sweden, Switzerland, and the UK. Videos of some of her talks are online, including of her TEDx talk.

Selected publications
Diamond has authored or co-authored about a hundred papers on her research work. What follows are some of her selected publications:

 Diamond, A. (1991). Neuropsychological insights into the meaning of object concept development. In S. Carey & R. Gelman (Eds.), The epigenesis of mind: Essays on biology and knowledge. (pp. 67–110). Hillsdale, NJ: Lawrence Erlbaum Associates.
 Diamond, A. (2001).  A model system for studying the role of dopamine in prefrontal cortex during early development in humans. In C. Nelson & M. Luciana (Eds.), Handbook of developmental cognitive neuroscience. (pp. 433–472). Cambridge, MA: MIT Press.
 
 
 
 
 
  (Special Section on Mindfulness and Compassion in Human Development)

See also 
 Developmental cognitive neuroscience
 Sluggish cognitive tempo

References 

American women psychologists
American women neuroscientists
Canadian cognitive neuroscientists
Developmental neuroscience
Canada Research Chairs
Harvard Graduate School of Arts and Sciences alumni
Swarthmore College alumni
Year of birth missing (living people)
Living people
Attention deficit hyperactivity disorder researchers
American Jews
Scientists from New York City
Academics from New York (state)
21st-century American women scientists
Academic staff of the University of British Columbia Faculty of Science